Peter Thomson may refer to:

 Peter Thomson (golfer) (1929–2018), Australian golfer
 Peter Thomson (diplomat) (born 1948), Fiji's Permanent Representative to the United Nations
 Peter Thomson (footballer) (born 1977), English footballer
 Peter Thomson (priest) (1936–2010), Anglican clergyman who influenced future Prime Minister Tony Blair
 Peter Thomson (racing driver) (born 1965), Canadian race car driver
 Peter Donald Thomson (1872–1955), Scottish minister and moderator of the General Assembly of the Church of Scotland
 Peter Thomson dress, a sailor dress,  after the c. 1900 American former naval tailor credited with creating the style

See also
 Peter Thompson (disambiguation)
 Peter Mitchell-Thomson, English race car driver